The Stony River is a  tributary of the North Branch Potomac River in Grant County in West Virginia's Eastern Panhandle. The Stony River joins with the North Branch at the Mineral County border. Its source lies north of the Dolly Sods Wilderness on the Tucker County border in the Allegheny Front. Tributaries of the Stony River include Mud Run, Red Sea Run, Morgan Run, Helmick Run, Fourmile Run, Laurel Run, and Mill Run.

Near its source, the Stony River was once dammed by the Stony River Dam to create Stony River Reservoir between  Cabin Mountain and  Fore Knobs. The center portion of the dam has since been demolished and the reservoir drained.  Further north, the Stony River is dammed again to form the  Mount Storm Lake.

See also
List of West Virginia rivers

References

Rivers of Grant County, West Virginia
Rivers of West Virginia
Tributaries of the Potomac River